Before the Stanley Cup playoffs, a list of forty on-ice officials are named to work: Twenty referees and twenty linesmen. They are paired up in each round, traveling and working together between the series. Usually, they are never assigned to work two games between two teams they have already seen. This does not apply if a series reaches seven games, or at any point in time beginning in the third round. If a game seven is reached, those who have been assigned to work in the next round will call the series-deciding game. If at any time a referee or linesman is injured or unable to work, there is a standby official; he is there in the event that one of the officials cannot continue in the game.

Throughout the playoffs, the list of officials is minimized.

 During the second round, twenty-four officials (twelve referees and twelve linesmen) work games.
 During the third round, sixteen officials (eight referees and eight linesmen) work games.

In the final round of cuts, the list is reduced to ten officials: Five referees and five linesmen. They are named as Stanley Cup Finals officials. They are no longer in pairs; they will rotate so that all officials are involved in the series. If the Stanley Cup Final reaches a game seven, the top two referees and two linesmen will be assigned to officiate the game.

2022―present

2022 Stanley Cup Finals

Referees
 Gord Dwyer
 Jean Hebert
 Wes McCauley
 Chris Rooney
 Kelly Sutherland

Linesmen
 Steve Barton
 Ryan Daisy
 Brad Kovachik
 Kiel Murchison
 Jonny Murray

2021
In 2021, the NHL broke teams up into new divisions: Three in the United States, and one in Canada. The referees and linesmen were semi-restricted from crossing the border throughout the regular season, only being allowed to move between the two countries either when they were re-assigned to work games, or when the semifinals began (and including the final).

Referees
 Francis Charron
 Gord Dwyer
 Eric Furlatt
 Dan O'Rourke
 Kelly Sutherland

Linesmen
 David Brisebois
 Scott Cherrey
 Michel Cormier
 Kiel Murchison
 Jonny Murray

2020
In 2020, the playoffs looked a little different. Referees and linesmen were placed in two separate bubbles for the qualifier round and the first two rounds (Toronto for the Eastern Conference and Edmonton for the Western Conference). The sixteen remaining officials would come together in Edmonton when there were four teams remaining in the playoffs.

As part of the NHLOA's recent collective bargaining agreement, 2020 was the first year they would name five referees and five linesmen to the Cup Final. Next to each official is the bubble in which they started the playoffs in.

Referees
 Francis Charron (Toronto)
 Steve Kozari (Edmonton)
 Wes McCauley (Toronto)
 Dan O'Rourke (Edmonton)
 Kelly Sutherland (Edmonton)

Linesmen
 Derek Amell (Toronto)
 Steve Barton (Toronto)
 Scott Cherrey (Edmonton)
 Brad Kovachik (Edmonton)
 Matt MacPherson (Toronto)

2019
Before the 2019 Stanley Cup Finals, the NHL assigned five referees and four linesmen to the series: Something they hadn't done since 2001. This was done, possibly because one of the referees (Wes McCauley) had sustained a leg injury during game six of the Western Conference Final and left the game. Even though he was named to work the Finals, he did not work in the seven-game series.

Referees
 Gord Dwyer
 Steve Kozari
 Wes McCauley
 Chris Rooney
 Kelly Sutherland

Linesmen
 Derek Amell
 Scott Cherrey
 Greg Devorski
 Pierre Racicot

2002-2018
Beginning with the 2002 Stanley Cup Finals, the NHL assigned two referees and two linesmen for each game. A total of eight on-ice officials are named: Four referees and four linesmen.

2018 Stanley Cup Finals

Referees
 Marc Joannette
 Wes McCauley
 Chris Rooney
 Kelly Sutherland

Linesmen
 Derek Amell
 Greg Devorski
 Matt MacPherson
 Jonny Murray

2017 Stanley Cup Finals

Referees
 Wes McCauley
 Brad Meier
 Dan O'Halloran
 Kevin Pollock

Linesmen
 Scott Cherrey
 Shane Heyer
 Brad Kovachik
 Brian Murphy

2016 Stanley Cup Finals

Referees
 Wes McCauley
 Dan O'Halloran
 Dan O'Rourke
 Kelly Sutherland

Linesmen
 Derek Amell
 Brian Murphy
 Jonny Murray
 Pierre Racicot

2015 Stanley Cup Finals

Referees
 Wes McCauley
 Dan O'Halloran
 Kevin Pollock
 Kelly Sutherland 

Linesmen
 Derek Amell
 Shane Heyer
 Brian Murphy
 Pierre Racicot

2014 Stanley Cup Finals

Referees
 Wes McCauley
 Steve Kozari
 Dan O'Halloran
 Brad Watson

Linesmen
 Derek Amell
 Scott Driscoll
 Shane Heyer
 Brad Kovachik

2013 Stanley Cup Finals

Referees
 Wes McCauley
 Dan O'Halloran
 Chris Rooney
 Brad Watson

Linesmen
 Shane Heyer
 Brian Murphy
 Pierre Racicot
 Jay Sharrers

2012 Stanley Cup Finals

Referees
 Dan O'Halloran
 Dan O'Rourke
 Chris Rooney
 Brad Watson

Linesmen
 Derek Amell
 Jean Morin
 Jonny Murray
 Pierre Racicot

2011 Stanley Cup Finals

Referees
 Dan O'Halloran
 Dan O'Rourke
 Kelly Sutherland
 Stephen Walkom

Linesmen
 Steve Miller
 Jean Morin
 Pierre Racicot
 Jay Sharrers

2010 Stanley Cup Finals

Referees
 Bill McCreary
 Dan O'Halloran
 Kelly Sutherland
 Stephen Walkom

Linesmen
 Greg Devorski
 Steve Miller
 Jean Morin
 Pierre Racicot

2009 Stanley Cup Finals

Referees
 Paul Devorski
 Marc Joannette
 Dennis LaRue
 Bill McCreary

Linesmen
 Derek Amell
 Steve Miller
 Jean Morin
 Pierre Racicot

2008 Stanley Cup Finals

Referees
 Paul Devorski
 Marc Joannette
 Dan O'Halloran
 Brad Watson

Linesmen
 Shane Heyer
 Jean Morin
 Pierre Racicot
 Jay Sharrers

2007 Stanley Cup Finals

Referees
 Paul Devorski
 Bill McCreary
 Dan O'Halloran
 Brad Watson

Linesmen
 Scott Driscoll
 Shane Heyer
 Jean Morin
 Jay Sharrers

2006 Stanley Cup Finals

Referees
 Paul Devorski
 Bill McCreary
 Michael McGeough
 Brad Watson

Linesmen
 Greg Devorski
 Jean Morin
 Pierre Racicot
 Jay Sharrers

2004 Stanley Cup Finals

Referees
 Kerry Fraser
 Bill McCreary
 Stephen Walkom
 Brad Watson

Linesmen
 Scott Driscoll
 Brian Murphy
 Ray Scapinello
 Mark Wheler

2003 Stanley Cup Finals

Referees
 Paul Devorski
 Dan Marouelli
 Bill McCreary
 Brad Watson

Linesmen
 Brad Lazarowich
 Brian Murphy
 Tim Nowak
 Mark Wheler

2002 Stanley Cup Finals

Referees
 Paul Devorski
 Don Koharski
 Bill McCreary
 Stephen Walkom

Linesmen
 Brad Lazarowich
 Jean Morin
 Brian Murphy
 Dan Schachte

1999-2001
Between the 1999 and 2001 playoff seasons, the National Hockey League implemented a two referee, two linesman system. Five referees and four linesmen were named to work in the finals.

2001 Stanley Cup Finals

Referees
 Paul Devorski
 Kerry Fraser
 Dan Marouelli
 Bill McCreary
 Rob Shick

Linesmen
 Kevin Collins
 Brad Lazarowich
 Dan Schachte
 Mark Wheler

2000 Stanley Cup Finals

Referees
 Kerry Fraser
 Terry Gregson
 Don Koharski
 Dan Marouelli
 Bill McCreary

Linesmen
 Gord Broseker
 Ray Scapinello
 Dan Schachte
 Jay Sharrers

1999 Stanley Cup Finals

Referees
 Kerry Fraser
 Terry Gregson
 Don Koharski
 Dan Marouelli
 Bill McCreary

Linesmen
 Gord Broseker
 Kevin Collins
 Ray Scapinello
 Jay Sharrers

1979-1998
The National Hockey League used a single referee for each playoff game, with a rotation of three referees for the series.  The referee with the highest regular-season performance rating was assigned games one, four, and seven; the second-highest rated referee was assigned games two and five; and the third-highest rated referee was assigned games three and six.

1998
 Terry Gregson
 Don Koharski
 Bill McCreary
1994
 Terry Gregson
 Bill McCreary
 Andy Van Hellemond
1990
Kerry Fraser
Don Koharski
Andy Van Hellemond
1986
 Kerry Fraser
 Don Koharski
 Andy Van Hellemond
1982
 Wally Harris
 Andy Van Hellemond
 Ron Wicks

1997
 Kerry Fraser
 Terry Gregson
 Bill McCreary
1993
 Kerry Fraser
 Terry Gregson
 Andy Van Hellemond
1989
 Kerry Fraser
 Denis Morel
 Andy Van Hellemond
1985
 Kerry Fraser
 Bryan Lewis
 Andy Van Hellemond
1981
 Bryan Lewis
 Dave Newell
 Andy Van Hellemond

1996
 Don Koharski
 Bill McCreary
 Andy Van Hellemond
1992
 Terry Gregson
 Don Koharski
 Andy Van Hellemond
1988
 Don Koharski
 Denis Morel
 Andy Van Hellemond
1984
 Bryan Lewis
 Dave Newell
 Andy Van Hellemond
1980
 Wally Harris
 Bob Myers
 Andy Van Hellemond

1995
 Kerry Fraser
 Terry Gregson
 Bill McCreary
1991
 Kerry Fraser
 Don Koharski
 Andy Van Hellemond
1987
 Don Koharski
 Dave Newell
 Andy Van Hellemond
1983
 Wally Harris
 Bryan Lewis
 Andy Van Hellemond
1979
 Bob Myers
 Dave Newell
 Andy Van Hellemond

See also

References

Officials
National Hockey League lists
 Stanley Cup Finals